B J S M Madathil V H S School is an aided school in Thazhava North, Karunagapally, Kollam district, Kerala, India, which was founded by V.Vasudevan Pillai in 1957 . The school, which started as an Upper Primary school, was upgraded to High school in 1979. Vocational Higher Secondary courses were introduced in the school from 1995. The vocational courses offered in the school are Civil construction and Maintenance, M. L T, MOBE, T&T and OS. There are about 3500 students studying in the school from class five to twelve.

References

External links
 http://www.vhse.kerala.gov.in

Schools in Kollam district
High schools and secondary schools in Kerala